The government of Nazi Germany was totalitarian dictatorship governed by Adolf Hitler and the Nazi Party according to the Führerprinzip. Nazi Germany was established in January 1933 with the appointment of Adolf Hitler as Chancellor of Germany, followed by suspension of basic rights and the Enabling Act which gave Hitler's regime the power to pass and enforce laws without the involvement of the Reichstag or German president, and ended with Germany's surrender in World War II on 8 May 1945. 

As the successor to the government of the Weimar Republic, it inherited the governmental structure and institutions of the previous state. Although the Weimar Constitution technically remained in effect until the German surrender, there were no actual restraints on the exercise of state power. In addition to the already extant Weimar government, the Nazi leadership created a large number of different organizations for the purpose of helping them govern and remain in power. They pursued a policy of rearmament and strengthened the Wehrmacht, established an extensive national security apparatus and created the Waffen-SS, the combat branch of the Schutzstaffel (SS).

Working towards the Führer

On 30 January 1933, President Paul von Hindenburg appointed Hitler as Chancellor of Germany. This event is known as the Machtergreifung (seizure of power). In the following months, the Nazi Party used a process termed Gleichschaltung (co-ordination) to rapidly bring all aspects of life under control of the party. All civilian organisations, including agricultural groups, volunteer organisations, and sports clubs, had their leadership replaced with Nazi sympathisers or party members. By June 1933, virtually the only organisations not controlled by the NSDAP were the army and the churches.  
By 1939, party membership was compulsory for all civil service officials. Hitler ruled Germany autocratically by asserting the Führerprinzip (leader principle), which called for absolute obedience of all subordinates. He viewed the government structure as a pyramid, with himself at the apex. Rank in the party was not determined by elections; positions were filled through appointment by those of higher rank. The Nazi Party used propaganda to develop a cult of personality around Hitler.

Top officials reported to Hitler and followed his policies, but they had considerable autonomy. Officials were expected to "work towards the Führer" – to take the initiative in promoting policies and actions in line with his wishes and the goals of the Nazi Party, without Hitler having to be involved in the day-to-day running of the country. He often deferred making decisions, avoided clear delegation and allowed subordinates to compete with one another, especially in the pre-war years. The government was not a coordinated, co-operating body, but rather a disorganised collection of factions led by members of the party elite who struggled to amass power and gain the Führer's favour.

The system of government was formed whereby leading Nazi officials were forced to interpret Hitler's speeches, remarks and writings on government policies and turn them into programs and legislation. Hitler typically did not give written orders; instead he communicated them verbally, or had them conveyed through his close associate, Martin Bormann. He entrusted Bormann with his paperwork, appointments, and personal finances; Bormann used his position to control the flow of information and access to Hitler. Hitler's cabinet never met after 1938, and he discouraged his ministers from meeting independently.

Hitler's leadership style was to give contradictory orders to his subordinates and to place them into positions where their duties and responsibilities overlapped with those of others, to have "the stronger one [do] the job". In this way, Hitler fostered distrust, competition, and infighting among his subordinates to consolidate and maximise his own power.

The process allowed more unscrupulous and ambitious Nazis to get away with implementing the more radical and extreme elements of Hitler's ideology, such as antisemitism, and in doing so win political favour. It was protected by Joseph Goebbels' effective propaganda machine, which portrayed Hitler as a heroic and infallible leader. Further, the government was portrayed as a dedicated, dutiful and efficient outfit. Through successive Reichsstatthalter decrees, Germany's states were effectively replaced by Nazi provinces called Gaue.

After June 1941 as World War II progressed, Hitler became preoccupied with military matters and spent most of his time at his military headquarters on the eastern front. This led Hitler to rely more and more on Bormann to handle the domestic policies of the country. On 12 April 1943, Hitler officially appointed Bormann as Personal Secretary to the Führer. By this time Bormann had de facto control over all domestic matters, and this new appointment gave him the power to act in an official capacity in any matter.

Historical opinion is divided between "intentionalists" who believe that Hitler created this system as the only means of ensuring both the total loyalty and dedication of his supporters, and the impossibility of a conspiracy; and the "structuralists" who believe that the system evolved by itself, and was a limitation on Hitler's totalitarian power.

The organization of the Nazi state was as follows:

Chancelleries and other national authorities

 Reich Chancellery (Hans Lammers)
 Presidential Chancellery (Otto Meissner)
 Party Chancellery (Martin Bormann)
 Chancellery of the Führer (Philip Bouhler)
 Council of Ministers for the Defense of the Reich (Hermann Göring)
 Secret Cabinet Council (Konstantin von Neurath)

Cabinet ministries
 Foreign Office (Konstantin von Neurath, Joachim von Ribbentrop)
 Interior Ministry (Wilhelm Frick, Heinrich Himmler)
 Ministry of Finance (Lutz Schwerin von Krosigk)
 Ministry of Justice (Franz Gürtner, Franz Schlegelberger, Otto Georg Thierack)
 Ministry of the Reichswehr (Werner von Blomberg)
 Ministry for Economics (Hjalmar Schacht, Hermann Göring, Walther Funk)
 Ministry of Food and Agriculture (Richard Walther Darré, Herbert Backe)
 Labor Ministry (Franz Seldte)
 Postal Ministry (Paul Freiherr von Eltz-Rübenach, Wilhelm Ohnesorge)
 Ministry of Transport (Paul Freiherr von Eltz-Rübenach, Julius Dorpmüller)
 Commission for Ocean Navigation (Karl Kaufmann)
 Ministry for Public Enlightenment and Propaganda (Joseph Goebbels)
 Ministry of Aviation (Hermann Göring)
Reichsluftschutzbund (Air Defence League)
 Ministry of Science, Education and Culture (Bernhard Rust)
 Ministry for Church Affairs (Hanns Kerrl)
 Ministry of Armaments and War Production (Fritz Todt, Albert Speer)
 Ministry for the Occupied Eastern Territories (Alfred Rosenberg)
 Ministers without Portfolio (Hermann Göring, Ernst Röhm, Rudolf Hess, Hanns Kerrl, Hans Frank, Hjalmar Schacht, Hans Lammers, Konstantin von Neurath, Arthur Seyss-Inquart, Wilhelm Frick & Konstantin Hierl)

Reich offices
 General Building Councillor for the Capital of the Movement (Hermann Giesler)
 General Building Inspector of the Reich Capital (Albert Speer)
 German Labor Front (Robert Ley)
 Strength Through Joy
 Office of the Four Year Plan (Hermann Göring)
 General Plenipotentiary for Labor Deployment (Fritz Sauckel)
 Forestry Office (Hermann Göring)
 Inspector General for German Roadways (Fritz Todt, Albert Speer)
 Inspector General for Water and Energy (Fritz Todt, Albert Speer)
 Reich Labor Service (Konstantin Hierl)
 Reichsbank (Hjalmar Schacht, Walther Funk)

State and provincial administrators
 Reichsstatthalter of German States
 Oberpräsidenten of Prussian provinces

Occupation authorities
 Protectorate of Bohemia and Moravia (Konstantin von Neurath, Wilhelm Frick)
 Deputy Protector of Bohemia and Moravia (Reinhard Heydrich, Kurt Daluege)
 General Government of Poland, (Hans Frank)
 Reichskommissariat for the Occupied Norwegian Territories (Josef Terboven)
 Reichskommissariat for the Occupied Dutch Territories (Arthur Seyss-Inquart)
 Reichskommissariat of Belgium and Northern France (Josef Grohé)
 Reichskommissariat Ostland (Hinrich Lohse, Erich Koch)
 Reichskommissariat Ukraine (Erich Koch)
 Office of the Military Governor of France (Otto von Stülpnagel, Carl-Heinrich von Stülpnagel)
 Civil Administration Area of Alsace (Robert Wagner)
 Civil Administration Area of Lorraine (Josef Bürckel, Willi Stöhr)
 Civil Administration Area of Luxembourg (Gustav Simon)
 Civil Administration Area of Lower Styria (Siegfried Uiberreither)
 Civil Administration Area of Upper Carniola (Friedrich Rainer)
 Civil Administration Area of Bialystok District (Erich Koch)

Legislative branch
 Reichstag
 President of the Reichstag (Hermann Göring)
 First Deputy President (Hanns Kerrl)
 Reichsrat (disbanded on February 14, 1934 by the "Law on the Abolition of the Reichsrat")

It has to be considered that there is little use talking about a legislative branch in a totalitarian state, where there is no separation of powers. Since passage of the Enabling Act the Reichsregierung (Reich cabinet) was empowered to enact Reichsgesetze (statute law) without respect to the 1919 constitution.

Judicial system
Most of the judicial structures and legal codes of the Weimar Republic remained in use during the Nazi era, but significant changes within the judicial codes occurred, as well as significant changes in court rulings. Most human rights of the constitution of the Weimar Republic were disabled by several Reichsgesetze (Reich's laws). Several minorities, opposition politicians and prisoners of war were deprived of most of their rights and responsibilities. The plan to pass a Volksstrafgesetzbuch (people's code of criminal justice) arose soon after 1933 but didn't come into reality until the end of World War II.

As a new type of court, the Volksgerichtshof (people's court) was established in 1934, only dealing with cases of political importance. In practice, it served only as a kangaroo court, conducting show trials that gave the appearance of legal process while handing down harsh sentences to political enemies. From 1934 to 1945, the court sentenced 10,980 people to prison and imposed the death penalty on 5,179 more who were convicted of high treason.  About 1,000 were acquitted. Its most prominent members were Otto Georg Thierack, president of the court from May 1936 to August 1942, and Roland Freisler who presided from August 1942 to February 1945. After the war ended, some surviving jurists were tried, convicted, and sentenced as war criminals.

Military organization

WehrmachtArmed Forces
OKWArmed Forces High Command
Chief of the Supreme Command of the Armed Forces
Field Marshal Wilhelm Keitel
Chief of the Operations Staff
Colonel General Alfred Jodl
Chief of Military Intelligence (Abwehr)
Rear Admiral Konrad Patzig (1932-1935)
Vice Admiral Wilhelm Canaris (1935-1944)
HeerArmy
OKHArmy High Command
Army Commanders-in-Chief
Colonel General Werner von Fritsch (1935 to 1938)
Field Marshal Walther von Brauchitsch (1938 to 1941)
Führer and Reich Chancellor Adolf Hitler (1941 to 1945)
Field Marshal Ferdinand Schörner (May 1945)
KriegsmarineNavy
OKMNavy High Command
Navy Commanders-in-Chief
Grand Admiral Erich Raeder (1928-1943)
Grand Admiral Karl Dönitz (1943-1945)
General Admiral Hans-Georg von Friedeburg (May 1945)
LuftwaffeAir Force
OKLAir Force High Command
Air Force Commanders-in-Chief
Reich Marshal Hermann Göring (to April 1945)
Field Marshal Robert Ritter von Greim (April 1945)

Paramilitary organizations
 Sturmabteilung (SA) (Ernst Röhm, Viktor Lutze, Wilhelm Schepmann)
 Schutzstaffel (SS) (Heinrich Himmler, Karl Hanke)
 Allgemeine-SS (General SS)
 SS-Totenkopfverbände (SS-TV)
 SS-Verfügungstruppe (SS-VT) Nazi Party troops, forerunner to Waffen-SS
 Waffen-SS (Armed SS) Nazi Party military branch from 1940, forward (Hans Jüttner)
 Nationalsozialistisches Kraftfahrerkorps (NSKK) (Adolf Hühnlein)
 Nationalsozialistisches Fliegerkorps (NSFK) (Friedrich Christiansen, Alfred Keller)

Police forces
Reich Security Main Office (RSHAReichssicherheitshauptamt) Reinhard Heydrich, Ernst Kaltenbrunner
 Security Service (Sicherheitsdienst - SD) Reinhard Heydrich, Ernst Kaltenbrunner
 Security Police (Sicherheitspolizei - SiPo) Reinhard Heydrich
 Secret State Police Geheime Staatspolizei (Gestapo) Reinhard Heydrich, Heinrich Müller
 Criminal Police Kriminalpolizei (Kripo) Arthur Nebe, Friedrich Panzinger
 Order Police (Ordnungspolizei - Orpo) Kurt Daluege
 Schutzpolizei (State Police)
 Gemeindepolizei (Local Police)

Political organizations
 Nazi PartyNational Socialist German Workers’ Party (abbreviated NSDAP)
 Führer (Adolf Hitler)
 Deputy Führer (Rudolf Hess)
 Party Treasurer (Franz Xaver Schwarz)
 Supreme Party Judge (Walter Buch)
 Reichsleiters
 Gauleiters
 AhnenerbeList of Ahnenerbe institutes
 National Socialist Women's League (Gertrud Scholtz-Klink)
 Youth organizations
 Hitler-JugendHitler Youth (for boys ages 14-18) (Baldur von Schirach, Artur Axmann)
 Deutsches Jungvolk (for boys ages 10–14)
 Faith and Beauty Society (For young women ages 17–21)
 Bund Deutscher Mädel (for girls ages 14-17)
 Jungmädelbund (for girls ages 10-14)

Service organizations
 Deutsche Reichsbahn (State Railway) (Julius Dorpmüller)
 Reichspost (State Postal Service) (Wilhelm Ohnesorge)
 Deutsches Rotes Kreuz (German Red Cross) (Charles Edward, Duke of Saxe-Coburg and Gotha)
 National Socialist People's Welfare (Erich Hilgenfeldt)

Religious organizations
 German Christians (movement) (Ludwig Müller)
 German Evangelical Church (Ludwig Müller)
 German Faith Movement

Academic and professional organizations
 Academy for German Law
 National Socialist Association of Legal Professionals
 National Socialist Civil Servants League
 National Socialist German Doctors' League
 National Socialist German Lecturers League
 National Socialist German Students' League
 National Socialist Teachers League

ReferencesNotesBibliography'